The New York County Lawyers Association (NYCLA) is a bar association located in New York City.

The New York County Lawyers Association was founded in 1908 because the existing bar association excluded some lawyers from membership due to their race, gender, ethnicity or religion. A meeting held in Carnegie Hall in 1907 determined to create a "democratic bar association" and 143 attorneys incorporated the NYCLA a few months later. Throughout its history, NYCLA has included all who wish to join and their focus has been the active pursuit of legal system reform.

The association is located at the New York County Lawyers Association Building in Lower Manhattan. It provides opinions on candidates for judicial office, organizes forums and investigations and expresses the associations opinions on matters concerning the legal system in New York and jurisprudence in general, and provides Continuing Legal Education (CLE) for attorneys in New York and New Jersey. NYCLA creates Task Forces and publishes reports highlighting issues of special concern to the public and legal community. NYCLA is currently certified as an accredited provider of continuing legal education for both New York and New Jersey.

NYCLA is a bar association organized for charitable and educational purposes. Its objectives are to advance the science of jurisprudence, and to promote the administration of justice and reforms in the law. They elevate the standards of integrity, honor and courtesy in the legal profession and foster the spirit of collegiality among members of the Association and throughout the bar. A main focus is to apply its knowledge and experience in the field of law to the promotion of the public good, and to arrange for the provision by its members of free legal services for indigent, low income and other persons in need. Throughout history they have encouraged diversity throughout the legal profession and ensured access to justice for all. They have always maintained high ethical standards for the bench and bar; and have promoted high quality legal education and other resources for law students and lawyers.

NYCLA has joint membership programs with seven minority bar associations. The Asian-American Bar Association of New York, Indian-American Lawyers' Association, Korean-American Lawyers' Association of Greater New York, Lesbian, Gay, Bisexual and Transgender Law Association of New York, Metropolitan Black Bar Association, Puerto Rican Bar Association and South Asian Bar Association of New York.

History
1907 – A group of lawyers gathered in Carnegie Hall to address the prospect of forming a bar group where politics were not obstacles to inclusion. The bar leaders who met were determined to create, in the words of Joseph Hodges Choate (who would become president of NYCLA in 1912), "the great democratic bar association of the City [where] any attorney who had met the rigid standards set up by law for admission to the bar should, by virtue of that circumstance, be eligible for admission."
1908 – Attorneys or counsellors of the Supreme Court of the State of New York in active practice officially incorporated the New York County Lawyers Association. It initially included both the borough of Manhattan and the borough of the Bronx.
1929 – Construction begins on the Home of Law, at 14 Vesey Street, a building designed by renowned architect Cass Gilbert.
1930 – 14 Vesey Street building is dedicated as the Home of Law.
1943 – NYCLA successfully urges the American Bar Association to declare its membership open to all lawyers without regard to race.
1946 – NYCLA works with other local bar associations to establish legal referral services to provide referrals to attorneys, many of whom were returning from serving in World War II.
1949 – NYCLA sponsors a conference on civil rights in the post-World War II era.
1952 – NYCLA publishes a groundbreaking report on public apathy toward delinquent children. The report brought wide acclaim and won the endorsement of Mayor Robert F. Wagner.
1956 – At NYCLA's urging, the American Bar Association removes questions about race from its membership application.
1972 – The Women's Rights Committee of NYCLA is established to address all legal concerns that affect women.
1976 – NYCLA launches the New York County Legal Services Corporation, the first bar association-sponsored prepaid legal services plan in the country, to help small businesses and middle-income families find lawyers and assure the lawyers' availability for a reasonable fee.
1989 – Consistent with its view that pro bono service should be voluntary, NYCLA organizes a conference of county bar associations from around the state to coordinate their unanimous opposition to Chief Judge Wachtler's proposal to require all lawyers to render 40 hours of civil pro bono service every two years.
1995 – NYCLA inducts its first female president, Rosalind Fink.
1997 – NYCLA's proposal to increase fees for attorneys to improve the quality of defense afforded to indigent defendants wins the endorsement of bar associations across the state.
2001 – NYCLA organizes efforts to help those affected by the September 11th attacks, including relief efforts like the Death Certificate Project to help affected families obtain documentation for insurance and other benefits.
2003 – NYCLA issues a report urging that the practice of videotaping custodial interrogations be mandated in New York State. The report is approved by the New York State Bar Association and the American Bar Association's House of Delegates the following year.
2006 – NYCLA establishes a Task Force to develop a plan of action to increase the Housing 	Court's effectiveness in administering justice for the people of New York City. The Task Force subsequently examines the statutory framework of the Housing Court and releases several reports with suggestions.
2007 – NYCLA inducts its first African American president, Catherine Christian.
2008 – NYCLA establishes a Task Force on the Family Court to analyze proceedings from two conferences that the NYCLA Justice Center convened on the Family Court and develops a reform agenda to reassess the way in which family courts address the central needs of children and families who appear in these courts.
2011-2014 – The Task Force on Judicial Budget Cuts, established in 2011, addresses the effects of continuing budget cuts, including sequestration, on the administration of justice in the federal courts of New York, including the United States District Courts for the Southern District and the Eastern District of New York.

Committees, Task Forces & Public Policy
New York County Lawyers Association plays an active role in the development of legal and public policy, including spearheading efforts to support diversity in the legal profession with its Summer Minority Judicial Internship Programs which provides stipends to law students of color who are placed as interns with federal and state court judges, as well as pioneering some of the most far-reaching and tangible reforms in American jurisprudence. NYCLA's standing Committees and Sections continue to expand to cover the changing and growing interests of public sector and the legal community. Standing Committees and Sections include the following: 
Admiralty and Maritime Law		
Alternative dispute resolution
Animal Law
Anti-Trust and Trade Regulations
Appellate courts
Art law
Asian Practice
Banking
Bankruptcy Law
Civil Court Practice Section
Civil Rights and Liberties
Construction Law
Corporation Law
Criminal Justice Section
Cyberspace Law
Education law
Elder Law
Election law
Entertainment Intellectual Property and Sports law
Environmental Law
Estates trust section
Family Court and Child Welfare
Federal Courts
Foreign and International Law
Futures and Derivatives
Health Law
Immigration and Nationality
In-House/Outside Counsel
Insurance Law
Judicial Section
Labor Relations and Employment Law
Law and Literature
Law-Related Education
Lesbian/Gay/Bisexual/Transgender Issues
Matrimonial law Section
Minorities and the law
Municipal Affairs
Non-Profit Organizations
Professional Discipline
Professional Ethics
Real Property Sections
Securities & Exchanges
Senior Lawyers
Solo and Small Firm Practice
Supreme Court
Taxation
Tort Law Section
Women's Rights
Young Lawyers' Section

Task Forces
NYCLA Task Force on Judicial Budget Cuts   
NYCLA Task Force on the Family Court
NYCLA Task Force on Professionalism
NYCLA Task Force on Judicial Section
NYC Criminal Courts Task Force
NYCLA Task force on Corporate Responsibility
NYCLA Task Force on Ethics Reform
NYCLA Task Force on Housing Courts
NYCLA Task Force on Same-Sex Marriage
NYCLA Task Force on Campaign Finance Reform
NYCLA Task Force to Increase Diversity in the Legal Profession
NYCLA Task Force on Meeting the Challenge ("50 hour rule")

Publications
NYCLA's newspaper, New York County Lawyer, is published ten times per year – once each month except for August and December – in both print and online versions. Its articles focus on emerging trends and "hot" topics in the legal industry, and are authored by a mix of NYCLA members and outside experts.
Attorneys' Guide to Civil Practice in the New York Supreme Court which provides information designed to help practitioners navigate the complexities of the New York County Supreme Court.
Commercial Litigation in New York State Courts is a multi-volume treatise published as a joint venture between NYCLA and Thomson Reuters Westlaw. It includes substantive chapters on various commercial subjects as well as detailed discussions of procedure.
Committee Reports used to analyze and report on pending legislation and proposed rule making by administrative agencies and the courts.
Construction Law Journal which includes articles on recent trends and developments in that field.
New York City Criminal Courts Manual which is designed as a guide to practice in the New York City criminal courts. It has information about basic criminal law (including statutory and case law citations) and court procedures.
The New York Rules of Professional Conduct which are the ethical rules governing all attorneys licensed to practice in New York.

Pro bono work
On September 14, 2012, the New York State Court of Appeals adopted a new rule requiring applicants for admission to the New York State bar to perform 50 hours of pro bono services. NYCLA is a strong supporter of voluntary pro bono efforts by the New York State Bar (NYSBA), and they devote thousands of hours each year to providing free legal advice and representation to New Yorkers who otherwise could not afford those services.

NYCLA offers several pro bono programs to its members: 
U. S. Tax Court Project - NYCLA is the first New York bar association to provide a U.S. Tax Court calendar call pro bono program. Through this program, NYCLA members provide clients with counseling on tax law during calendar call sessions. 
Legal Counseling Project – NYCLA members prepare clients for pro se representation by reviewing documents, answering questions and discussing issues of concern in the areas of family, employment, and landlord/tenant law.
Manhattan CLARO (Civil Legal Advice and Resource Office) – CLARO was created in response to a spike in low-income families being sued by collection agencies. NYCLA members offer legal advice and provide information and resources to pro se litigants in regards to debt matters.
Project Restore – NYCLA members provide assistance and representation to individuals with misdemeanor and felony convictions who are denied vocational licenses by the New York Department of State, under the condition that the individual's adjudicated criminal history predates the employment license application, causing the denial. 
Veterans Discharge Upgrade Pro Bono Pilot Program - Military discharges that are not characterized as "Honorable" can disqualify veterans from many benefits and carry a stigma that can make it difficult to find employment. A service member generally receives a discharge characterization that is less than Honorable due to inferior performance or misconduct. However, a number of military service members have received less than Honorable discharges due to misconduct arising from post-traumatic stress disorder or traumatic brain injury that is very often misdiagnosed or undiagnosed. NYCLA's Veterans Discharge Upgrade Pro Bono Pilot Program provides assistance to veterans seeking to upgrade the characterization of their military discharge.
Wills for Heroes - Despite the inherently dangerous nature of their jobs, an overwhelmingly large number of first responders do not have simple wills. NYCLA collaborates with the Wills for Heroes Foundation to prepare free will and other estate planning documents for federal agents of the United States District Court and Port Authority Police Department and their spouses or domestic partners.  
Small Business Owner Educational Workshops - Many owners of small businesses in New York often lack the knowledge necessary to comply with various laws and regulations. They end up being prosecuted criminally for conduct that could have been avoided with proper education. Working in collaboration with the New York County District Attorney's Office, the Asian American Bar Association, the Chinese Chamber of Commerce of New York, Chinatown Partnership, and the Chinatown Business Improvement District, in 2013 NYCLA held a series of workshops in Chinatown to assist the small business owners in understanding general record keeping, compliance with tax laws, labor law issues, construction permitting laws, and immigration issues.

Annual events
Charles Evans Hughes Memorial Lecture: The Hughes Lecture Series was instituted by the NYCLA in 1948 to pay tribute to Charles Evans Hughes, whose career had a substantial impact on the evolution of law and public policy.
Ida B. Wells-Barnett Award Reception: In honor of one of the first African American women to run for public office in the United States.
Law Day Luncheon: Honors the tradition of upholding the rule of law, and recognizes service to the advancement of the law.
Luncheon Honoring Federal Courts in NYC: Honors the federal courts in New York City and those judges of the federal courts who have brought honor and exhibited exemplary service.
Annual Dinner: Features a keynote speaker addressing compelling issues of the day, as well as the presentation of annual awards to judges and lawyers who have been influential in making equal justice under the law a reality.

Awards and honors
The Jack Newton Lerner Award for excellence in continuing legal education.
The Capozzoli Gavel Award, named in honor of Justice Louis J. Capozzoli is awarded to a distinguished Judge or attorney who embodies the highest ideals of the profession at NYCLA's annual Law Day Luncheon.
The Ida B. Wells-Barnett Justice Award is named for one of the first African-American women to run for public office in the United States.  
Public Service Awards and Criminal Justice Stipends honors lawyers in the public sector who have distinguished themselves as innovators, role models, and solvers of complex legal problems.
The Law & Literature Award is given to authors, who through their writings of fiction, non-fiction or poetry have enhanced the public's understanding of the legal profession, legal systems, or legal issues.
The Edith I. Spivack Award honors the creation of the New York County Lawyer's Association's Women's Rights Committee.
The Edward Weinfeld Award for Distinguished Contributions to the Administration of Justice is presented by NYCLA's Federal Courts Committee each October to a judge who embodies the fairness and dedication to the judiciary exemplified by Judge Edward Weinfeld. 
The William Nelson Cromwell Award honors the unselfish service to the profession and the community.
The Boris Kostelanetz President's Medal is presented annually to an individual who has given significant service to NYCLA.
The Diversity Award is given each year at NYCLA's Annual Dinner to recognize an individual's leadership, efforts and achievements in increasing diversity in the legal profession.

Leadership and Governance
NYCLA leadership consists of our officers, which include (1). President, who acts as CEO; (2). President-Elect, who is a member of all committees and sections, and who fills in for the President at meetings in his or her absence; (3). Vice President, who is delegated power by the President or the NYCLA Board; (4). Secretary of the Board, who keeps records of the Association and its proceedings, among other duties; and (5). Treasurer, who, subject to the control of the Board of Directors, is in general charge of Association funds.

NYCLA Presidents

John F. Dillon: 1908-1909
Alton B. Parker: 1909-1912
Joseph H. Choate: 1912-1914
Thomas H. Hubbard: 1914-1915
Edgar M. Cullen: 1915-1916
Henry A. Gildersleeve: 1916-1917
Morgan J. O'Brien: 1917-1919
Charles E. Hughes: 1919-1921
Charles Strauss: 1921-1923
James A. O'Gorman: 1923-1925
Samuel Seabury: 1925-1927
William Nelson Cromwell: 1927-1930
Henry W. Taft: 1930-1932
Charles A. Boston: 1932-1934
Robert C. Morris: 1934-1936
Charles E. Hughes Jr.: 1936-1938
George Z. Medalie: 1938-1940
Robert Marsh: 1940-1942
William Dean Embree: 1942-1944
Ignatius M. Wilkinson: 1944-1946
Joseph M. Proskauer: 1946-1948
I. Howard Lehman: 1948-1950
John F. Brosnan: 1950-1952
Edwin M. Otterbourg: 1952-1954
William J. O'Shea: 1954-1956
Ben A. Matthews: 1956-1958
Arthur H. Schwartz: 1958-1960
Francis S. Bensel: 1960-1962
Eugene A. Sherpick: 1962-1963
Leo Gottlieb: 1963-1965
Mark F. Hughes: 1965-1967
James V. Hayes: 1967-1969
Boris Kostelanetz: 1969-1971
Thomas Kiernan: 971-1973
Henry N. Ess III: 1973-1975
Wilbur H. Friedman: 1975-1977
Lawrence X. Cusack: 1977-1979
Hon. Harold Baer Jr.: 1979-1981
James W. Lamberton: 1981-1982
Denis McInerney: 1982-1984
Daniel C. Draper: 1984-1986
Kenneth J. Bialkin: 1986-1988
Eugene P. Souther: 1988-1990
Arthur Norman Field: 1990-1992
Robert L. Haig: 1992-1994
Casimir C. Patrick II: 1994-1995
Klaus Eppler: 1995-1996
John J. Kenney: 1996-1997
Rosalind S. Fink: 1997-1998
Stephen D. Hoffman: 1998-2000
Craig A. Landy: 2000-2002
Michael Miller: 2002-2004
Norman L. Reimer: 2004-2006
Edwin David Robertson: 2006-2007
Catherine A. Christian: 2007-2008
Ann B. Lesk: 2008-2010
James B. Kobak Jr: 2010-2011
Stewart D. Aaron: 2011-2013
Barbara Moses: 2013-2014
Lewis Tesser: 2014-2015
Carol A. Sigmond: 2015 - 2017

References
Notes

External links
 Official website
 Legal Referral Service (sponsored by NYCLA)

Organizations established in 1908
Legal organizations based in the United States
1908 establishments in New York City